Yingzhoulu Subdistrict is a subdistrict in Hejian, Cangzhou, Hebei, China. Prior to 2016 it was a town known as Yingzhou Town.

References

Township-level divisions of Hebei
Hejian